Northern Districts cricket team may refer to:

Northern Districts men's cricket team
Northern Districts women's cricket team